Hassan Boustouni was an Arab Israeli footballer with Maccabi Haifa F.C. Beginning his career in 1963, Boustouni was the first Arab footballer in the league's history. He was also the nephew of Rostam Bastuni, the first Arab citizen of Israel to represent a Zionist party in the Knesset.

References

Year of birth missing (living people)
Living people
Arab-Israeli footballers
Arab citizens of Israel
Israeli footballers
Maccabi Haifa F.C. players
Association footballers not categorized by position